Events in the year 2018 in Namibia.

Incumbents
President: Hage Geingob
Vice President: Nickey Iyambo (until 12 February); Nangolo Mbumba (from 12 February)
Prime Minister: Saara Kuugongelwa
Chief Justice: Peter Shivute

Events

12 February – Nangolo Mbumba takes over as Vice President, succeeding Nickey Iyambo

Deaths

15 January – Rosalia Nghidinwa, politician (b. 1952).

13 March – Nora Schimming-Chase, politician and diplomat (b. 1940)

14 July – Theo-Ben Gurirab, politician (b. 1938).

11 December – Petrus Iilonga, politician and political prisoner, Deputy Minister of Defence (born 1947).

References

 
2010s in Namibia 
Years of the 21st century in Namibia 
Namibia 
Namibia